The Marvelwood School is a college preparatory private boarding school located in Kent, Connecticut, United States.

History 
Marvelwood was founded in 1956 by Robert A. Bodkin and Ian Hanna in Cornwall, Connecticut, on a campus previously occupied by Rumsey Hall School. Ian Hanna named the school after his relative Donald Grant Mitchell, an American novelist who owned an estate in New Haven, Connecticut, also called Marvelwood.

Bodkin remained headmaster until 1981. He was succeeded by Peter B. Tacy until 1989, H. Mark Johnson until 1997, Anne Davidson Scott until 2005, Scott E. Pottbecker until 2011, and Arthur F. Goodearl until 2018. Blythe Everett P '14,'16 is the current head of the school.

Admissions 

The Marvelwood student body consists primarily of boarding students, with about 20% of students commuting from home. Of those boarding students, about 24% are international, coming from countries such as China, Afghanistan, or Japan. The school offers a three-level ESL program to accommodate foreign speakers. There are also a lot of kids who used to go to treatment.

Demographics

Curriculum 
Intentionally small and flexible, Marvelwood offers an intimate mountain-top setting for students who benefit from focused and individual attention and encouragement. Students are engaged in unique and hands-on programming, nurturing them toward academic and personal confidence. Their program is geared toward providing a strong preparation for college and laying the foundation for a lifetime of curiosity, inquiry, and learning.

Marvelwood's optional Learning Support Program customizes one-on-one and small-group curricula to suit each student. Orton-Gillingham-trained teachers work with students with dyslexia and other language-based learning differences.

Students participate in various activities outside the classroom, including weekly community service, competitive athletics, creative arts programs, and an award-winning film studies program. Marvelwood works locally with the Audubon Sharon and Institute for Bird Populations.

Notable alumni 

 Jake Burton Carpenter - founder of Burton Snowboards
 John P. Hammond - blues singer and guitarist
 Arthur Levering - modern composer of classical music

References

External links 
 

Kent, Connecticut
Boarding schools in Connecticut
Private high schools in Connecticut
Schools in Litchfield County, Connecticut